The Apedale Heritage Centre was created at the site of Staffordshire's Apedale Mine and is run by volunteers. It is located just outside the village of Chesterton near Newcastle-under-Lyme in the Apedale Community Country Park.

Attractions include mine tours and a museum which concentrates on the area's history, and industrial heritage. Opening times are 10:30 to 16:00 daily with the underground tours taking place on weekends and bank holidays.

The site is also the home of the Moseley Railway Trust's collection of narrow gauge industrial locomotives.  A selection of locomotives can be viewed in the heritage centre museum and the trust holds open days for the public.  Work is under way to construct a separate museum and railway for the collection.

External links
Apedale Heritage Centre
The Moseley Railway Trust

Coal mines in Staffordshire
Mining museums in England
Museums in Staffordshire
Borough of Newcastle-under-Lyme
Underground mines in England